Michael Bacher (born 19 February 1988) is an Italian footballer who plays for AC Trento.

Biography
Born in Brixen, South Tyrol autonomous province as German speaking minority (majority in the province), Bacher started his professional career at FC South Tyrol, located in Bolzano, the capital of the province. On 2 July 2010 Bacher left for fellow third division club Cremonese.

International career
He was a member of Italy national under-17 football team in 2005 UEFA European Under-17 Football Championship (2 games).

He received call-up to Italy U20 Lega Pro team, for a 2006–07 Mirop Cup match against Slovakia. He played again in February 2009 against Hungary in 2008–09 Mirop Cup. He also played in 2009 Lega Pro Quadrangular Tournament for the representatives of Second Division Group A.

Honours
 Lega Pro Seconda Divisione: 2010 (South Tyrol)

References

External links
 FIGC 
 Football.it Profile 
 
 

Italian footballers
F.C. Südtirol players
U.S. Cremonese players
Association football midfielders
Sportspeople from Brixen
1988 births
Living people
Footballers from Trentino-Alto Adige/Südtirol